The first USS McCalla (DD-253) was a  in the United States Navy. She transferred to the Royal Navy as HMS Stanley (I73) during World War II.

Service history

As USS McCalla
Named for Bowman H. McCalla, she was laid down 25 September 1918 and launched 18 February 1919 by the Bethlehem Shipbuilding Corporation; sponsored by Mrs. Elizabeth McCalla Miller, daughter of Rear Admiral McCalla, and commissioned 19 May 1919.

McCalla remained in active status for less than 7 months. On 26 November 1919 she went into reserve at the Norfolk Navy Yard and decommissioned 30 June 1922. After war broke out in Europe, the destroyer recommissioned 18 December 1939 and prepared for turnover to Great Britain.

As HMS Stanley
She decommissioned and became a ship of the Royal Navy 23 October 1940 at Halifax, Nova Scotia as one of the destroyers transferred to England in exchange for bases in the West Indies. Commissioned as HMS Stanley (I73) she was designated for service in the Fourth "Town" Flotilla and departed Halifax 1 November. At St. John's on the 5th, when the German pocket battleship  attacked a convoy underway for the United Kingdom, sinking six ships, Stanley was dispatched to escort the convoy back to Nova Scotia. She rendezvoused with ships  out and escorted 15 vessels to Trinity Harbour. Delayed further for repairs, she finally got underway 14 December, arriving at Plymouth, England, 2 January 1941. Stanley was modified for long range trade convoy escort service by removal of the two forward boilers and substitution of additional fuel tanks. Three of the original 4"/50 caliber guns and one of the triple torpedo tube mounts were removed to reduce topside weight for additional depth charge stowage and installation of Hedgehog anti-submarine mortar.

Ready for service by August, Stanley was assigned first to the Western Approaches Command and then to the 40th Escort Group. One of her first convoys took her to Freetown, Sierra Leone, escorting ships carrying troops and equipment for Commonwealth units in the Middle East. On the return voyage she escorted a merchant convoy, departing 30 November. At Gibraltar in mid-December she joined Convoy HG-76, departing 14 December for Britain. On 17 December one of the escort carrier s aircraft sighted a submarine  on the port beam of the convoy. Stanley and four other escorts quickly established contact, sank , and picked up 55 survivors.

On 19 December 1941, success ran out. Stanley, on station astern of the convoy, reported the presence of another U-boat. Half an hour later  scored a direct hit; Stanley exploded and sank with the loss of all but 25 of her crew. Within 12 minutes, however, the sloop  responded and sank the submarine; 16 survivors were picked up.

Notes

References

External links
http://www.navsource.org/archives/05/253.htm

Clemson-class destroyers
Ships built in Quincy, Massachusetts
1919 ships
Ships transferred from the United States Navy to the Royal Navy
Town-class destroyers of the Royal Navy
Town-class destroyers converted from Clemson-class destroyers
World War II destroyers of the United Kingdom
Ships sunk by German submarines in World War II
World War II shipwrecks in the Atlantic Ocean
Maritime incidents in December 1941
Naval magazine explosions